Three Sisters with Maiden Hearts is a 1935 Japanese drama film directed by Mikio Naruse. It is based on the short story Sisters of Asakusa (浅草の姉妹, Asakusa no shimai) by Yasunari Kawabata and was the director's first sound film.

Plot
O-Ren, O-Some and Chieko are daughters of a hardened, middle-aged woman who runs a business of shamisen players, earning their money on their nightly rounds in bars in Asakusa. While O-Some still works in her mother's business, Chieko, her younger sister, works as a nightclub dancer. O-Ren, the eldest, tries to settle for a domestic life with her boyfriend Kosugi in an attempt to escape the half-world she has been associated with. In need of money, O-Ren lures Aoyama (unaware that he is Chieko's boyfriend) into an apartment, where her gangster friends threaten him. O-Some, who witnesses the crime, is hurt with a knife when she interferes to help Aoyama. Although she knows of O-Ren's scheme, O-Some bids her sister and Kosugi good-bye at the train station. Left alone in pain in the waiting room, O-Some murmurs, "that turned out good".

Cast
Chikako Hosokawa as O-Ren, the eldest sister
Masako Tsutsumi as O-Some, the middle sister
Ryuko Umezono as Chieko, the youngest sister
Chitose Hayashi as the mother
Chisato Matsumoto as O-Haru
Masako Sanjo as O-Shima
Mariyo Matsumoto as O-Kinu
Heihachirō Ōkawa as Aoyama, Chieko's boyfriend
Osamu Takizawa as Kosugi, O-Ren's boyfriend

Production
Three Sisters with Maiden Hearts was Naruse's first film for the P.C.L. film studio (later Toho) after his move from Shochiku. Naruse would remain affiliated with P.C.L./Toho for the rest of his professional career until 1967. In 1954, he adapted another work by Kawabata with his film Sound of the Mountain.

Bibliography

References

External links

1935 films
1935 drama films
Films based on short fiction
Japanese drama films
Films directed by Mikio Naruse
Films based on works by Yasunari Kawabata
1930s Japanese-language films